Daniel Ford (born 1931 in Arlington, Massachusetts) is an American journalist, novelist, and historian. The son of Patrick and Anne Ford, he attended public schools in New Hampshire and Massachusetts, graduating in 1950 from Brewster Academy in Wolfeboro, New Hampshire. He was educated at the University of New Hampshire (A.B. Political Science 1954), the University of Manchester (Fulbright Scholar, Modern European History 1954–55), and King's College London (M.A. War Studies 2010).

Ford served in the U.S. Army at Fort Bragg and in Orléans, France. Following an apprenticeship at the Overseas Weekly in Frankfurt, Germany, he became a free-lance writer in Durham, New Hampshire. He received a Stern Fund Magazine Writers' Award (1964) for his dispatches from South Vietnam, published in The Nation; a Verville Fellowship (1989–90) at the National Air and Space Museum to work with Japanese accounts of the air war in Southeast Asia; and an Aviation - Space Writers' Association Award of Excellence (1992) for his history of the Flying Tigers. He is best known for his Flying Tigers research and for the Vietnam novel that became the Burt Lancaster film Go Tell the Spartans.

Ford is a resident scholar at the University of New Hampshire. He writes for The Wall Street Journal, Michigan War Studies Review, and Air&Space/Smithsonian magazine; maintains the Warbird's Forum, Piper Cub Forum, and Reading Proust websites; and blogs on Daniel Ford's Blog.  He soloed in a J-3 Piper Cub at the age of 68 and flew as a sport pilot until he turned 80.

Non-fiction 
 Looking Back From Ninety: The Depression, the War, and the Good Life That Followed  (2021) 
 Cowboy: The Interpreter Who Became a Soldier, a Warlord, and One More Casualty of Our War in Vietnam  (2018) 
 Editor: The Greater America: An Epic Journey Through a Vibrant New Country  (1907, revised 2017) 
 Flying Tigers: Claire Chennault and His American Volunteers, 1941-1942  (1991, 2nd edition 2007, 3rd edition 2016; translated into Chinese) 
 Poland's Daughter: How I Met Basia, Hitchhiked to Italy, and Learned About Love, War, and Exile (2013) 
 A Vision So Noble: John Boyd, the OODA Loop, and America's War on Terror (2010) 
 Editor: The Lady and the Tigers: Remembering the Flying Tigers of World War II, by Olga Greenlaw (1943, revised 2002) 
 The Only War We've Got: Early Days in South Vietnam (2001) 
 Glen Edwards: The Diary of a Bomber Pilot (1998) 
 The Country Northward (1976, 2010)

Novels 
Michael's War: A Story of the Irish Republican Army (2003, 2015) 
Remains: A Story of the Flying Tigers (2000, 2013) 
The High Country Illuminator: A Tale of Light and Darkness and the Ski Bums of Avalon (1971, 2013) 
Incident at Muc Wa: A Story of the Vietnam War (1967; translated into Dutch; filmed as Go Tell the Spartans, 1976; 2012) 
Now Comes Theodora (1965, 2000)

References

External links
The Write Stuff
Press kit

1931 births
20th-century American novelists
21st-century American novelists
Alumni of the University of Manchester
Alumni of King's College London
American male journalists
American male novelists
Living people
Novelists from New Hampshire
University of New Hampshire alumni
People from Durham, New Hampshire
20th-century American male writers
21st-century American male writers
20th-century American non-fiction writers
21st-century American non-fiction writers
Brewster Academy alumni